Hérault is a department in the southwest of France.

Hérault may also refer to:

 Hérault (river) which give its name to the department
 René Hérault (1691-1740), magistrate and Lieutenant General of Police of Paris from 1725 to 1739
 Marie-Jean Hérault de Séchelles (1759 – 1794), French politician during the time of the French Revolution.

French-language surnames